Micropterix cornuella is a species of moth belonging to the family Micropterigidae. It was described by Lees, Rougerie, Zeller & Kristensen in 2010. It is only known from the type locality in northern India.

References

Micropterigidae
Moths described in 2010